Nandini I Love U is a 2008 Indian Oriya film directed by Ashok Pati. It is the first venture of Producer Anama Charana Sahoo, under the banner of Laxmi Puja Pvt. Ltd. Siddhanta Mahapatra and Buddhaditya Mohanty are playing the male lead characters whereas Bollywood fame Krisha is playing the female lead.

Cast
Siddhanta Mahapatra -Sri Ram
Budhaditya- Jeet
Krisha - Nandini
Ajit Das
Snigdha Mohanty
Anita Das
Bobby Mishra
Pintu Nanda
Debu Bramha
Mamuni Mishra
Roja

References

External links 
 
 

2008 films
2000s Odia-language films
Films directed by Ashok Pati
Odia remakes of Hindi films